A name is a word or term used for identification.

Name may also refer to:

Arts, entertainment, and media
 "Name" (song), a song by Goo Goo Dolls from their album A Boy Named Goo
 The Name (play), a 1995 play by the Norwegian writer Jon Fosse
 "The Name", initial episode in the list of Dilbert animated series episodes

Computing
 NAME (dispersion model), an atmospheric pollution dispersion model
 .name, a generic top-level domain for use on the Internet
 Name.com, a domain registrar
 Identifier (computer science), an entity name in programming languages and information processing systems

Other uses
 Name (sports) (also known as: the jersey name, shirt name, squad name, or uniform name), is the name worn on a player's uniform
 "Name", a wealthy individual who pledges their wealth to underwrite losses at Lloyd's of London
"Ha Shem", aka The Name, a reference to the Hebrew Tetragrammaton YHWH
 North American Midway Entertainment, or NAME, a fair midway service provider
 Personal name, the full set of names given to an individual

See also 
 Named (disambiguation)
 Names (disambiguation)
 Naming (disambiguation)